Monopamba is a settlement in Puerres Municipality, Nariño Department in Colombia.

Climate

References

Nariño Department